Saedinenie Snowfield on Livingston Island in the South Shetland Islands, Antarctica is situated southwest of Rose Valley Glacier, west of Panega Glacier, northwest of Kaliakra Glacier, north of lower Perunika Glacier and east-northeast of Tundzha Glacier.  It is bounded by Teres Ridge to the west, the glacial divide between the Drake Passage and Bransfield Strait to the south, Gleaner Heights, Elhovo Gap and Leslie Hill to the southeast, and Leslie Gap and Vidin Heights to the east. The snowfield extends 4.7 km inland and 15.5 km in southwest-northeast direction, and  drains into Hero Bay between Melta Point and Slab Point.

A survey bivouac in eastern Saedinenie Snowfield near Leslie Hill was occupied 24–28 December 2004.

The feature was named after the Bulgarian town of Saedinenie ('Reunification'), in association with the 120th anniversary of the Reunification of the Principality of Bulgaria and the province of Eastern Rumelia in 1885. This is one of the Bulgarian names bestowed on hitherto nameless geographical features by the Tangra 2004/05 Expedition.

Location

Maps
 L.L. Ivanov et al. Antarctica: Livingston Island and Greenwich Island, South Shetland Islands. Scale 1:100000 topographic map. Sofia: Antarctic Place-names Commission of Bulgaria, 2005.
 L.L. Ivanov. Antarctica: Livingston Island and Greenwich, Robert, Snow and Smith Islands. Scale 1:120000 topographic map. Troyan: Manfred Wörner Foundation, 2010.  (First edition 2009. )
 Antarctic Digital Database (ADD). Scale 1:250000 topographic map of Antarctica. Scientific Committee on Antarctic Research (SCAR). Since 1993, regularly upgraded and updated.
 L.L. Ivanov. Antarctica: Livingston Island and Smith Island. Scale 1:100000 topographic map. Manfred Wörner Foundation, 2017. 
 A. Kamburov and L. Ivanov. Bowles Ridge and Central Tangra Mountains: Livingston Island, Antarctica. Scale 1:25000 map. Sofia: Manfred Wörner Foundation, 2023.

References
 Saedinenie Snowfield. SCAR Composite Antarctic Gazetteer
 Bulgarian Antarctic Gazetteer. Antarctic Place-names Commission. (details in Bulgarian, basic data in English)

External links
 Saedinenie Snowfield. Copernix satellite image

Landforms of Livingston Island
Bulgaria and the Antarctic
Snow fields of Antarctica